The most popular Latin pop songs in 2003, ranked by radio airplay audience impressions and measured by Nielsen BDS.

References

United States Latin Pop Airplay
2003
2003 in Latin music